Irgens is a Norwegian surname. Notable people with the surname include:

Åshild Irgens (born 1976), Norwegian illustrator
Christian Andreas Irgens (1833–1915), Norwegian politician
Joachim Irgens von Westervick (1611–1675), Dano-Norwegian nobleman
Johan Irgens-Hansen (1854–1895), Norwegian literary critic, theatre critic and theatre director
Johannes Irgens (1869–1939), Norwegian barrister, diplomat and politician
Kjeld Stub Irgens (1879–1963), Norwegian politician during the German occupation of Norway
Lars Johannes Irgens (1775–1830), Norwegian jurist and politician
Ludvig Irgens-Jensen (1894–1969), Norwegian twentieth-century composer
Nils Christian Irgens (1811–1878), Norwegian military officer and politician
Ole Irgens (bishop) (1724–1803), bishop in the Church of Norway
Ole Irgens (politician) (1829–1906), Norwegian politician
Diane Jergens,born Dianne Irgens

See also
Irgens Estate, a private estate in Norway

Norwegian-language surnames